The Municipality of Razkrižje is a small municipality in Slovenia. The seat of the municipality is the town of Razkrižje. It was part of Zala County in the Kingdom of Hungary. It is now included in the Mura Statistical Region.

Settlements
In addition to the municipal seat of Razkrižje, the municipality also includes the following settlements:
 Gibina
 Kopriva
 Šafarsko
 Šprinc
 Veščica

References

External links

Municipality of Razkrižje on Geopedia

Razkrizje